Mount Elizabeth is a massive ice-free mountain,  high, standing  south of Mount Anne in the Queen Alexandra Range, Antarctica. It was discovered by the British Antarctic Expedition, 1907–09, and named for Elizabeth Dawson-Lambton, a supporter of the expedition.

Events 
 On 23 January 2013, C-GKBC (c/n:650), a Kenn Borek Air DHC-6 Twin Otter skiplane, with three Canadians on board, crashed onto Mount Elizabeth. The Emergency Locator Transmitter (ELT) was detected on the same day. The plane had been en route from the South Pole's Amundsen–Scott US station to Terra Nova Bay's Zucchelli Italian station, operating under the auspices of the Italian National Agency for New Technologies, Energy and Sustainable Economic Development (ENEA). The aircraft was found on 25 January 2013. It had impacted at the  level. The New Zealand helicopter rescue team which spotted the wreckage reported that the accident was not survivable. Canada has jurisdiction in investigating the crash. Recovery efforts were ended on 27 January, after having recovered the cockpit voice recorder (CVR), due to unsafe conditions.

See also
List of Ultras of Antarctica

References

External links
 "Mount Elizabeth, Antarctica" on Peakbagger

Mountains of the Ross Dependency
Shackleton Coast
Four-thousanders of Antarctica